María Teresa Infante Caffi is a Chilean judge at the International Tribunal for the Law of the Sea. She is a diplomat and previously served as Chile's Ambassador to the Netherlands.

Throughout her career she has held different positions at the national level and abroad. She was co-counsel of Chile before the International Court of Justice (ICJ) of The Hague in the Peru-Chile case, National Director of Borders and Limits of Chile, and she was part of a group of 35 experts who advised Chile on lawsuit by Bolivia before the ICJ.

Biography 
Infante is a lawyer educated at the University of Chile. She obtained a doctorate at the Graduate Institute of International Studies of Geneva in 1979.

She was a tenured professor at the University of Chile, and she also taught at the Diplomatic Academy. She was also director of the Institute of International Studies of the University of Chile and has been a member of various international law organizations.

Infante was in charge of Chile's legal and technical coordination in Peru's lawsuit for maritime boundaries, filed on July 9, 2009, and co-representative of Chile before the International Court of Justice (ICJ) in this Peru-Chile case.

Infante served as National Director of Borders and Limits of Chile, as part of the Ministry of Foreign Affairs.

In 2020, she was elected as a judge of the International Tribunal for the Law of the Sea.

Publications

Books 
 María Teresa Infante Caffi (2005). Modalidades de Integración en América Latina, París: Association Andrés Bello des Juristes Franco-Latino-Américains.
 María Teresa Infante Caffi, Rose Cave Schörh (1995). Solución judicial de controversias: el Derecho Internacional ante los tribunales internacionales e internos. Instituto de Estudios Internacionales, Sociedad Chilena de Derecho Internacional.
 María Teresa Infante Caffi, Sara Inés Pimentel Hunt, Rodrigo Díaz Albónico (1992(. El medio ambiente en la minería. Instituto de Estudios Internacionales, Universidad de Chile.

Articles 
"Antártica ante el Derecho Internacional". Audiovisual Library of International Law of the United Nations

References

Graduate Institute of International and Development Studies alumni
Chilean expatriates in Switzerland
Year of birth missing (living people)
Living people
Chilean diplomats
Academic staff of the University of Chile
Ambassadors of Chile to the Netherlands